National Highway 148D, commonly referred to as NH 148D is a national highway in  India. It is a spur road of National Highway 48. NH-148D traverses the state of Rajasthan in India.

Route 
Bheem, Parasoli, Gulabpura, Shahpura, Jahajpur, Hindoli, Gothara, Naniwa, Uniara.

Junctions  
 
  Terminal near Bheem.
  near Gulabpura.
  near Hindoli.
  Terminal near Uniara.

See also 
 List of National Highways in India
 List of National Highways in India by state

References

External links 

 NH 148D on OpenStreetMap

National highways in India
National Highways in Rajasthan